Paulo Teixeira may refer to:

 Paulo Teixeira (doctor), Brazilian doctor
 Paulo Teixeira (footballer) (born 1980), Portuguese footballer
 Paulo Teixeira (politician), Brazilian politician
 Paulo Teixeira Jorge (1934–2010), Angolan politician